Labinot-Mal is a village and a former municipality in the Elbasan County, central Albania. At the 2015 local government reform it became a subdivision of the municipality Elbasan. The population at the 2011 census was 5,291. The municipal unit consists of the villages Guri i Zi, Labinot-Mal, Serice, Lamolle, Bene, Lugaxhi, Qafe, Qerret, Shmil and Dritas.

References

Former municipalities in Elbasan County
Administrative units of Elbasan
Villages in Elbasan County